Spoiled Identity EP is an EP released by American crossover thrash band Iron Reagan. It was originally released as a free online download and as a 7-inch flexi disc in the June 2014 issue of Decibel. Recorded during the sessions for The Tyranny of Will, its tracks "The Living Skull", a tribute to Dave Brockie, and "Your Kid's an Asshole" were later featured as part of that album. Two additional tracks, "U Lock the Bike Cop" and "Glockin' Out" were included as bonus tracks on a 2015 limited edition 12-inch vinyl release.

Track listing

Personnel
Iron Reagan
Tony Foresta – vocals
Mark Bronzino – guitar
Phil Hall – guitar
Rob Skotis – bass guitar
Ryan Parrish – drums

Production
Produced by Phil Hall
Mixed by Robert Caldwell
Mastered by Scott Hull
Artwork by Alexis Mabry

References

External links
Official website

2014 albums
Iron Reagan albums